Les mots is the first compilation by French singer Mylène Farmer, released on 26 November 2001. It contains most of the singer's hits and three new songs. It was certified Diamond in France.

Background and release
In 2001, rumours were launched that Farmer was doing her first compilation. However, while some people thought that it would be a remixes compilation as Dance Remixes, for others it would be an acoustic compilation and for others, it would be a best of containing all Farmer's hits. Eventually, it was a best of, preceded by the release of the new single "Les Mots", the first international duet of Farmer. The best of was also entitled Les Mots and was released throughout Europe on 28 November 2001.

This album includes all Farmer's tracks released as singles since "Maman a tort" until "L'Histoire d'une fée, c'est...", except "On est tous des imbéciles" (due to problems of copyright) and "My Mum Is Wrong". It also contains several B-sides (two of them for the general public, the other ones in the long box ; "L'Annonciation" and "Dernier Sourire" don't feature on the album due to problems of copyright) and three news songs. The live singles are not included in the track listing. In total, there are 30 tracks for the general public and 33 titles for the limited edition. A long box was made with four CD instead of two, including a DVD of the new Farmer's video.

The booklet is composed of very sexy and provocative photographs of Farmer in suggestive positions wearing pearly stockings, a pink pants and a silk négligée. These photos were taken by Ellen Von Unwerth, with a budget of 67,000 euros. However, unlike previous albums, the singer is smiling in these photos.

There were four singles from this best of: "L'Histoire d'une fée, c'est..." (27 February 2001), "Les Mots" (13 November 2001), "C'est une belle journée" (16 April 2002) and "Pardonne-moi" (21 October 2002). The two first ones were released before the best of, and the two others after this one.

Critical reception
"Les mots" was generally well received by contemporary musical critics and media.

According to La Libre Belgique, the Farmer's work is "synthesized in a superb way" in this album. This compilation also "gives an idea of the real musical evolution" of the artist. The Swiss newspaper Le Matin described this album as "a superb compilation" and "a 'must' in the matter", containing "many hits", with "provocative" images. The French magazine Flèches Cool said that this album is an "imposing best of with 27 tracks, all very well known and appreciated by a wide public". Télé Star praised the first CD, saying it contains hits with "unstoppable melody", "flights of strings", and "tortured or sexy words", while it criticized the second CD, that "testifies the frayed inspiration of the singer". As for Voici, "this double album stands out".

Commercial performance
The album reached the highest position in France and Belgium since its release. According to France Soir and La Lanterne, 670,000 copies of this album were sold in the first month in France, and 700,000 in the two first months, according to Jukebox.

In France, the best of debuted at #1 on Top Compilations on 1 December 2001 and remained there for 6 consecutive weeks. It appeared in the Top 10 for 39 weeks. It was ranked on this chart over one year, thanks to the release of the two new songs "C'est une belle journée" and "Pardonne-moi". It was the best-selling compilation in 2001 and 2002.

In Belgium, the album went straight to #2 on 12 December 2001, and then became number 1 for four weeks. It remained in the Top 10 for 15 weeks and in the Top 40 for 43 weeks. The album featured at #28 and #14 on the 2001 and 2002 end of year chart.

In Switzerland, the album got its highest position when it entered at # 6, on 12 December 2001, and remained on the chart (Top 100) for 38 weeks.

The best of won the World Platinum Award. It was certified Diamond in France, 	2×Platinum in Belgium, and Gold in Switzerland.

Track listing

CD/Cassette
Disc one/A-side
 "Maman a tort"
 "Plus grandir"
 "Libertine"
 "Tristana"
 "Sans contrefaçon"
 "Ainsi soit-je..."
 "Pourvu qu'elles soient douces"
 "Sans logique"
 "À quoi je sers..."
 "La Veuve noire"
 "Désenchantée"
 "Regrets" (featuring Jean-Louis Murat)
 "Je t'aime mélancolie"
 "Beyond My Control"
 "Que mon cœur lâche"

Disc two/B-side
 "Les mots" (featuring Seal)
 "California"
 "XXL"
 "L'Instant X"
 "Comme j'ai mal"
 "Rêver"
 "C'est une belle journée"
 "L'Âme-stram-gram"
 "Je te rends ton amour"
 "Effets secondaires"
 "Souviens-toi du jour"
 "Optimistique-moi"
 "Innamoramento"
 "L'Histoire d'une fée, c'est..."
 "Pardonne-moi"

Collector's edition
Contains a third CD with new tracks and b-sides, while first and second CD's contain only a-sides.

Disc one
 "Maman a tort"
 "Plus grandir"
 "Libertine"
 "Tristana"
 "Sans contrefaçon"
 "Ainsi soit-je..."
 "Pourvu qu'elles soient douces"
 "Sans logique"
 "À quoi je sers..."
 "Désenchantée"
 "Regrets" (featuring Jean-Louis Murat)
 "Je t'aime mélancolie"
 "Beyond My Control"
 "Que mon cœur lâche"

Disc two
 "California"
 "XXL"
 "L'Instant X"
 "Comme j'ai mal"
 "Rêver"
 "L'Âme-stram-gram"
 "Je te rends ton amour"
 "Souviens-toi du jour"
 "Optimistique-moi"
 "Innamoramento"
 "L'Histoire d'une fée, c'est..."

Disc three
 "Les mots" (featuring Seal)
 "C'est une belle journée"
 "Pardonne-moi"
 "La veuve noire"
 "Mylène is Calling"
 "Effets secondaires"
 "Puisque..."
 "My Soul Is Slashed"

DVD
 "Les mots" (video)

European edition
 "Les mots"
 "Sans contrefaçon"
 "Libertine"
 "Pourvu qu'elles soient douces"
 "Désenchantée"
 "Je t'aime mélancolie"
 "California"
 "XXL"
 "L'Instant X"
 "Rêver"
 "L'Âme-stram-gram"
 "Je te rends ton amour"
 "Souviens-toi du jour"
 "Innamoramento"
 "C'est une belle journée"
 "Pardonne-moi"

Personnel

 Produced by Laurent Boutonnat
 Mixed by Bertrand Châtenet
Except: "Maman a tort": Philippe Omnes; "Tristana", "Sans contrefaçon", "Ainsi soit je...", "Pourvu qu'elles soient douces", "Sans logique", "À quoi je sers...", "La Veuve noire", "Désenchantée", "Regrets", "Je t'aime mélancolie", "Beyond My Control" and "Que mon cœur lâche"
 Programmation, keyboards and arrangement for "Les Mots", "C'est une belle journée", "Pardonne-moi": Laurent Boutonnat
 Sound: Bertrand Châtenet, Jérôme Devoise and Rik Pekkonen
 Strings arrangement: Jean-Jacques Charles
 Drum kit: Karim Ziad and Abraham Laboriel Jr
 Bass: Michel Alibo
 Guitar: Slim Pezin
 Recorded at Studio Guillaume Tell, Paris
 Management: Thierry Suc for TSM
 Executive production: Paul Van Parys for Stuffed Monkey
 Photographs: Ellen Von Unwerth / H&K
 Design: Henry Neu for Com'N.B
 Mastering: André Perriat, Top Master
 Lyrics: Mylène Farmer
Except: "Maman a tort": Jérôme Dahan; "Libertine": Laurent Boutonnat
 Music: Laurent Boutonnat
Except: "Maman a tort": Laurent Boutonnat and Jérôme Dahan; "Libertine": Jean-Claude Déquéant; "Optimistique-moi": Mylène Farmer
 Editions : Requiem Publishing
Except: "Maman a tort": Cezame / BMG Music Publishing France; "Plus grandir", "Libertine", "Tristana", "Sans contrefaçon", "Ainsi soit je...", "Pourvu qu'elles soient douces", "Sans logique", "À quoi je sers...", "La Veuve noire" : Universal Music Publishing / BMG Music Publishing France

Charts

Weekly charts

Year-end charts

Certifications and sales

Formats

 Double CD – Crystal case
 Double CD  – Digipack – Limited edition (100,000)
 Cassette 1 – Double length
 Cassette 2 – Double length
 Quadruple LP
 Collector edition – Long Box 3 CD + 1 DVD – Limited edition (30,000) (1)
 CD – European version (2)
 Double CD – Digipack – Promo
 Cassette 1 – Double length – Promo
 Cassette 2 – Double length – Promo
 Collector edition – Long Box 3 CD + 1 DVD – Promo (1)

(1) Contains also a third CD
(2) Only one CD with 16 songs

References

2001 greatest hits albums
Mylène Farmer albums
2001 video albums
Music video compilation albums
Polydor Records compilation albums
Polydor Records video albums